Joellyn Toler Duesberry (June 30, 1944 – August 5, 2016) was a landscape artist who worked in oils.

She said that her paintings echo the work of John Marin and Milton Avery. Of her art, Duesberry said, "I am not interested in a realist painting, I am not interested in an abstract painting. I am interested in the tension."

Early life and education
Joellyn Toler Duesberry was born on June 30, 1944 in Richmond, Virginia. Growing up in rural Virginia instilled in her a love for the land. She said, "All my life I think I've unconsciously tried to re-create the place where bliss or terror first came to me. Both emotions seemed so strong that I had to locate them outside of myself, in the land. This goes back to a childhood habit--of living in rural Virginia and seeking woods and creeks and lakes for solitary refuge; places where I could sketch and paint." She decided to start painting at age ten after being given a pair of red tennis shoes and walking on the beach, inspired by the colorful juxtaposition of sand, shadow, and shoe. Soon thereafter she decided that "Women artists existed and she needed to be among them."

She received a BA with Distinction, Phi Beta Kappa, in art history and painting, from Smith College in 1966. In that year she was awarded a Woodrow Wilson Fellowship. While at Smith, she "honed her skills by making countless copies of masterworks."  She took her master's degree at New York University Institute of Fine Arts. Despite her degrees, she is considered to be a self-taught artist.

Work
Joellyn Duesberry was a plein air painter, who began "her canvases outdoors on an easel and finish[ed] them in the studio, frequently making monotypes in between."

She moved to Denver in 1985, and embraced the Colorado landscape in her art. In that year she received an Individual Painting Grant from the National Endowment for the Arts to work with Richard Diebenkorn.

In 1997, Duesberry won the Benjamin Altman Landscape Prize from the National Academy of Design. While she had a World Views residency with the Lower Manhattan Cultural Council (LMCC) from 1998-1999, Duesberry painted city studies in studio space in some vacant offices of the World Trade Center's North Tower. She says that, because of her connection to the World Trade Center, the tone of her painting saddened after 9/11.

In 2005, a PBS documentary was made of Joellyn Duesberry's life, work, and creative process titled Joellyn Duesberry: Dialogue with the Artist.

Her works are held by institutions such as Metropolitan Museum of Art and Smith College Museum of Art.

Publications
 1998: A Covenant of Seasons: Monotypes by Joellyn T. Duesberry, Poetry by Pattiann Rogers, 
 2011: Elevated Perspective: The Paintings of Joellyn Duesberry,

Personal life and death
In 1984, Duesberry met Dr. Ira Kowal, a Denver cardiologist, while at a dinner party in Vail. They married in 1986 and lived in Greenwood Village, Colorado.

Duesberry died from pancreatic cancer, aged 72, on August 5, 2016. She was  survived by her husband; a sister, Pat Washko; stepdaughters Rebekah Kowal and Jessica Kowal, and extended family.

References

External links
 Official website
 Joellyn Duesberry: Dialogue with the Artist

1944 births
2016 deaths
American landscape painters
American women painters
New York University Institute of Fine Arts alumni
Artists from Richmond, Virginia
Smith College alumni
20th-century American women artists
Deaths from pancreatic cancer
Deaths from cancer in Colorado
21st-century American women